Steven Deja (born 21 May 1987) is a German bobsledder who has competed since 2006.

References

1987 births
Living people
German male bobsledders